Hindringham is a village and a civil parish  in the English county of Norfolk. The nearest railway station is at Sheringham for the Bittern Line which runs between Sheringham, Cromer and Norwich. The nearest airport is Norwich International Airport.

History and Origins
The name Hindringham means "The land of the people living behind the hills". Hindringham is mentioned in the Domesday Book of 1086 where it is listed as Hidringham, Hindringaham, and Indregeham.

A series of archaeological test pits were dug between 2007 and 2015 The report was published in 2019.

Prominent landmarks

St Martin Parish Church
The Parish church is dedicated to St Martin and dates from the 14th century. It stands prominent and tall behind a long line of red-roofed flint cottages. A wall separates the churchyard from the six-foot drop to the road. The chancel is offset to the south against the nave. The font dates from the 15th century and is decorated with a Crucifixion, Instruments of the Passion and a Holy Trinity symbol along with heraldic shields. The church has an ancient chest which is thought to be one of the oldest in England, dating from the end of the 12th century.  It is a Grade I listed building.

Hindringham Hall
Hindringham Hall is a 16th-century moated brick and flint house located roughly quarter of a mile to the North West of the village centre. It was built by Martin Hastings, a courtier in the service of Henry FitzRoy, Duke of Richmond and Somerset, the illegitimate son of Henry VIII by his mistress Elizabeth Blount. A lease written in 1562 refers to the house 'now being builded and edified'. It had fallen into decline until restored in 1900 by Gerald Gosselin from Bengeo Hall, Hertfordshire. The interior was completely refurbished, the exterior largely being retained.

The moat and associated fish ponds date from the 12th century. They are fed from the River Stiffkey, which runs through the grounds. Before the Dissolution of the Monasteries the ponds were managed by the monks of Norwich Priory, and comprised an important food source for it. Though somewhat silted up, they remain amongst the best preserved in East Anglia.

The extensive gardens are the work of the current owners, and include a significant rose collection. They were shortlisted for the Historic Houses 2020 Garden of the Year award. They are open to the public on certain days during the Summer months.

Hindringham Lower Green tower windmill
The village has a windmill although it is actually situated in the nearby hamlet of Lower Green.

Amenities
The village has a mixed non-denominational Primary School under the control of the Norfolk education authority. Hindringham has a popular sports and social club and this acts as the clubhouse for Hindringham FC on matchdays.

Sports and recreation

Hindringham FC
The village football club, Hindringham F.C. was originally formed in 1910 and re-formed in 1986. The club has worked its way up to senior status in the Football Association National Pyramid since the re-formation.

They were elected from the North East Norfolk League to the Anglian Combination in 1998 and eventually won promotion to the Premier Division from Division 1 in the 2006–07 season and in dramatic fashion. With only a win good enough in their final game away at Sprowston Wanderers, a goal in second half stoppage time sealed a 1–0 victory and a runner's-up spot. Hindringham stayed in the Premier Division for two seasons before finally being relegated in the 2008–09 season. They had been relegated the previous season but the withdrawal of Halvergate United and Lowestoft Town from the division meant that the club stayed in the Premier Division for another season. They have been in Division 1 ever since the 2008-09 relegation.

From the 2005–06 to the 2007–08 season, the club ran a successful youth team which won their league the first season and made two cup final appearances during this time. (Captain Yotis Alamanous Vice Captain Adrian Belton)

Hindringham's last home match in front of the old clubhouse was a 6–1 defeat to Norwich St.Johns in Division 1 on 24 April 2010. In May 2010 the old clubhouse was demolished and a new clubhouse opened in March 2011. The clubhouse used to also act as the village pub but is now solely a clubhouse. The building is called 'The Pavilion'. Because of the ongoing work to the clubhouse, the 2010–11 season up to March saw Hindringham play their home games at Kelling Road, Holt and Clipbush Park, Fakenham. Some home games were played on the opposition's ground. The first game after the completion of the new clubhouse was on 12 March 2011 against Sprowston Athletic. Hindringham won 3–0.

The club's home ground can either be called The Elms or Wells Road. During their early Anglian Combination years up to the late 2000s, first team matches regularly attracted crowds of around 30–50 with some matches managing to attract crowds close to 100. In an Anglian Combination Division 1 match against Sheringham in May 2005, an attendance of over 100 was recorded. The attendance was confirmed by the then chairman of the club later on.

The team play in black and white striped shirts, black shorts and black socks. Their away kit is black and royal blue striped shirts and royal blue shorts and socks.

Hindringham's main rivals are Fakenham Town, Holt United and Wells Town. Other clubs nearby include Walsingham (who Hindringham have traditionally played in an annual pre-season cup competition) and Binham.

See also
Hindringham Lower Green tower windmill

References

  Office for National Statistics & Norfolk County Council, 2001. "Census population and household counts for unparished urban areas and all parishes".
https://web.archive.org/web/20051228034127/http://www.455th.ukpc.net/tomfeise/tomhind.htm

External links

Villages in Norfolk
Civil parishes in Norfolk
North Norfolk